Anthems for the Could've Bin Pills is a 2000 album by KC Accidental. It is a companion album to Captured Anthems for an Empty Bathtub, with tracks 1-6 on one album and 7-12 on the other.

Many of the musicians involved went on to record Feel Good Lost the following year under the name Broken Social Scene.

Track listing

When Captured Anthems was reissued by Noise Factory in 2003, the order was reversed so that the six music tracks were followed by the six blank tracks.

References

2000 albums
KC Accidental albums